(R)Evolution: The Remixes is a remix album from German trance producer and DJ Paul van Dyk released on 22 February 2013. The album consists of 18 selected remixes of songs from the original Evolution album in 2012.

Track listing

References

External links 
 http://www.discogs.com/Paul-van-Dyk-REvolution-The-Remixes/release/4333046 (R)Evolution : The Remixes at Discogs

Paul van Dyk albums
2013 remix albums
Remix albums by German artists